The International Classification of Primary Care (ICPC) is a classification method for primary care encounters. It allows for the classification of the patient’s reason for encounter (RFE), the problems/diagnosis managed, primary or general health care interventions, and the ordering of the data of the primary care session in an episode of care structure. It was developed by the WONCA International Classification Committee (WICC), and was first published in 1987 by Oxford University Press (OUP). A revision and inclusion of criteria and definitions was published in 1998. The second revision was accepted within the World Health Organization's (WHO) Family of International Classifications.

The classification was developed in a context of increasing demand for quality information on primary care as part of growing worldwide attention to global primary health care objectives, including the WHO's target of "health for all".

History
The first version of ICPC, which was published in 1987, is referred to as ICPC-1. A subsequent revision which was published in the 1993 publication The International Classification of Primary Care in the European Community: With a Multi-Language Layer is known as ICPC-E.

The 1998 publication, of version 2, is referred to as ICPC-2. The acronym ICPC-2-E, refers to a revised electronic version, which was released in 2000. Subsequent revisions of ICPC-2 are also labelled with a release date.

Structure

Chapters

The ICPC contains 17 chapters:
 A General and unspecified
 B Blood, blood forming organs, lymphatics, spleen
 D Digestive
 F Eye
 H Ear
 K Circulatory
 L Musculoskeletal
 N Neurological
 P Psychological
 R Respiratory
 S Skin
 T Endocrine, metabolic and nutritional
 U Urology
 W Pregnancy, childbirth, family planning
 X Female genital system and breast
 Y Male genital system
 Z Social problems

Components
The ICPC classification, within each chapter, is based on 3 components coming from 3 different classifications:
 Reason for Encounter Classification (1981)
 International Classification of Process in Primary Care (IC-Process-PC) (1985)
 International Classification of Health Problem in Primary Care (ICHPPC-2-d) (1976, 1983)

See also

Classifications
Medical classification
Anatomical Therapeutic Chemical Classification System (ATC classification for drugs)
Classification of Pharmaco-Therapeutic Referrals (CPR)
International Classification of Functioning, Disability and Health (ICF)
International Statistical Classification of Diseases and Related Health Problems (ICD)
ICPC-2 PLUS
Health care
Family medicine / Family practice
General practice / General practitioner
Primary care
Primary health care
Referral (medicine)
Health informatics
Electronic health record
International Organization for Standardization Technical Committee on Health Informatics
World Organization of Family Doctors (WONCA)
WONCA International Classification Committee (WICC)

References

Bibliography 
  Bentzen N (ed). WONCA international glossary for general/family practice. Fam Pract. 1995; 12:267.

External links 
 WICC at WONCA
 Primary Healthcare Classification Consortium (Classification Committee)
 ICPC-2e (by the Norwegian Centre for Informatics in Health and Social Care)
 University of Sydney Family Medicine Research Centre
 ICPC publication bibliography

Primary care
General practice
Medical classification
International Classification of Diseases
Diagnosis classification
Clinical procedure classification